Marie-Lise or Marie Lise is a French feminine given name. Notable people with this name include:

 Marie-Lise Chanin (born 1934), French geophysicist and aeronomist
 Marie Lise Monique Émond (1930–2020), Canadian actress

See also
 Marie, a female given name

French feminine given names
Compound given names
Feminine given names